Phillip Bruce Danyew (born October 31, 1986) is an American singer, multi-instrumentalist, songwriter, and producer. He released two extended plays in 2009, Danyew and Wake Up with EMI/Sparrow Records. He is a former touring member of Foster the People.

Early life
Danyew was born as Phillip Bruce Danyew on October 31, 1986 in Orange County, California. His father, Gregory Bruce Danyew, is a painter and musician, and mother, Julie I. Danyew (née Barnes) is also a musician. He has a twin sister, Rachael Marie Danyew. Danyew started his songwriting career while he was in the seventh grade.

Music career
Danyew started his music career in 2006, yet his first extended play, The EP, was not independently released until February 17, 2009. His next two extended plays were released by Sparrow Records, Danyew, on April 21, 2009, while Wake Up was released on November 17, 2009.

In 2011, Danyew created a band, Hitpoints. He joined the band Foster the People in late 2013 as a touring member. Danyew released the single "Friends for Life" via the label Old Wizard in August 2019 as a homage to The Beatles.

Danyew has produced music for HalfNoise, Katelyn Tarver, and Danae.

Discography
As Danyew
 The EP (February 17, 2009, Independent)
 Danyew (April 21, 2009, Sparrow)
 Wake Up (November 17, 2009, Sparrow)

As Phil Danyew
 "Friends for Life" (August 16, 2019, Old Wizard)
 "Can't Help but Fall" / "Strange Fate" / "You and Me Together" / "Life's a Cherry Pie" (with Katelyn Tarver) / "Can't Stand the Heat" (2020) for The Planters (Original Motion Picture Soundtrack)

As Elephant Castle (solo project)
 "Cool to Be Unhappy" (March 27, 2020, Old Wizard)
 "I'm a Loser" (May 8, 2020, Old Wizard)
 "Life in Outer Space" (2020)
 "My Muse" (2020)
 "Euphoria" (2020)
 "In Circles" (2021)
 "French Food" (2021)
 "Rocket to the Moon" (2021)
 "Caught in a Twilight Zone" (2021)
 "Quicksand" (2022)
 "No Me and You" (2022)

As Wave System (with Taylor Johnson)
 Inside a Dream (2021)

References

External links
 Cross Rhythms artist profile
 Louder Than the Music artist profile

1986 births
Living people
Musicians from San Diego
Songwriters from California
Sparrow Records artists